Stuart Carolan is an Irish screenwriter, producer, and playwright. He is best known for creating, executive producing, and writing the crime drama Love/Hate.

Career

Theater
His 2004 play Defender of the Faith was produced at the Abbey Theatre and won the George Devine award for Best New Play in the UK & Ireland.

His subsequent play The Empress of India was a commission from the Druid Theatre Company and directed by Tony award winner Garry Hynes.

In 2007 Carolan served as Writer-in-Association at Dublin's Abbey Theatre

Television
Carolan created, executive produced, and wrote the crime drama Love/Hate. The series ran from 2010 to 2015 on RTÉ One and depicted the world of Dublin's gangs and their families. Carolan wrote all 28 episodes of Love/Hate during its entire run, and won the IFTA award for Best Television Screenplay for five consecutive years. The series went on to set Irish television records and became the most-watched Irish drama in history.

In 2018 Carolan executive produced and co-wrote Taken Down for RTÉ, Freemantle, and Arte, a crime series that explored the modern refugee crisis.

In 2020 Carolan was showrunner and executive producer of the television series The Alienist: Angel of Darkness for TNT, Paramount Television, and Anonymous Content. The series follows up the 2018 limited series The Alienist.

Filmography

Awards
 2005 George Devine Award
 2009: IFTA award nomination, "Best Script for Television" for Little White Lie 
 2011: IFTA award Won, "Best Writer: Television Drama" for Love/Hate series 1
 2012: IFTA award Won, "Best Writer: Television Drama" for Love/Hate series 2
 2013: IFTA award Won, "Best Script Drama" for Love/Hate series 3
 2014: IFTA award Won, "Best Script Drama" for Love/Hate series 4
 2015: IFTA award Won, "Best Script Drama" for Love/Hate series 5

References

External links

"Empress of India", RTE, James McMahon

Living people
Irish dramatists and playwrights
Irish male dramatists and playwrights
Irish television writers
Irish screenwriters
Male television writers
Showrunners
Year of birth missing (living people)